Eugene Lewis (born  1940) is an American political scientist. One of the leading academic authorities on the concept of political entrepreneurship, Lewis is the author of Public Entrepreneurship: Toward a Theory of Bureaucratic Political Power (1980). His current research focuses on the role of science and technology in politics and law. He has also published influential works on 'political entrepreneurs' such as Admiral Hyman Rickover.

Lewis recently retired from a professorship of political science at New College of Florida. He also served as the school's former provost.

Additionally, Lewis is an internationally recognized and critically acclaimed sculptor.

Selected works
Public Entrepreneurship: Toward a Theory of Bureaucratic Political Power: the organizational lives of Hyman Rickover, J. Edgar Hoover, and Robert Moses. Indiana University Press (1980)

References

External links
 Website at New College of Florida

Living people
American political scientists
New College of Florida faculty
1940s births